A dogma of the Catholic Church is defined as "a truth revealed by God, which the magisterium of the Church declared as binding". The Catechism of the Catholic Church states:

The faithful are only required to accept a teachings as dogma if the Catholic Church clearly and specifically identifies them as dogmas.

Elements: Scripture and tradition
The concept of dogma has two elements: 1) the public revelation of God, which is divine revelation as contained in sacred scripture (the written word) and sacred tradition, and 2) a proposition of the Catholic Church, which not only announces the dogma but also declares it binding for the faith. This may occur through an ex cathedra decision by a Pope, or by a definitive statement made by an Ecumenical Council. Truths formally and explicitly revealed by God are dogmas in the strict sense when they are proposed or defined by the church, such as the articles of the Nicene Creed which are drawn from the early church councils. Catholicism holds that the understanding of scripture continues to deepen and mature over time through the action of the Holy Spirit in the history of the church and in the understanding of that faith by Christians, all the while staying identical in essence and substance. Dei verbum states: "both sacred tradition and Sacred Scripture are to be accepted and venerated with the same sense of loyalty and reverence."

Dogma as divine and Catholic faith

A dogma implies a twofold relation: to divine revelation and to the authoritative teaching of the Catholic Church.

A dogma's "strict signification is the object of both Divine Faith (Fides Divina) and Catholic Faith (Fides Catholica); it is the object of the Divine Faith by reason of its Divine Revelation; it is the object of Catholic Faith on account of its infallible doctrinal definition by the Church. If a baptised person deliberately denies or doubts a dogma properly so-called, he is guilty of the sin of heresy [...], and automatically becomes subject to the punishment of excommunication".

At the turn of the 20th century, a group of theologians called modernists stated that dogmas did not come from God but are historical manifestations at a given time. In the encyclical Pascendi dominici gregis, Pope Pius X condemned this teaching in 1907. The Catholic position is that the content of a dogma has a divine origin, that is that said content is considered to be an expression of an objective truth that does not change.

However, truths of the faith have been declared dogmatically throughout the ages. The instance of a Pope doing this outside an Ecumenical Council is rare, though there were two instances in recent times: the Immaculate Conception of Mary in 1854 and the Assumption of Mary into heaven in 1950. Both Pope Pius IX and Pope Pius XII consulted the bishops worldwide before proclaiming these dogmas. A movement to declare a fifth Marian dogma for "Mediatrix" and "Co-Redemptrix" was underway in the 1990s, but had been opposed by the bishops at Vatican II and has faced strong opposition since.

Early uses of the term
The term Dogma Catholicum was first used by Vincent of Lérins (450), referring to "what all, everywhere and always believed". In the year 565, Emperor Justinian declared the decisions of the first ecumenical councils as law "because they are true dogmata" of God.

Ecumenical Councils issue dogmas. Many dogmas – especially from the early Church (Ephesus, Chalcedon) to the Council of Trent – were formulated against specific heresies. Later dogmas (Immaculate Conception and Assumption of Mary) express the greatness of God in binding language. At the specific request of Pope John XXIII, the Second Vatican Council did not proclaim any dogmas. Instead it presented the basic elements of the Catholic faith in a more understandable, pastoral language. The last two dogmas were pronounced by Popes, Pope Pius IX in 1854 and Pope Pius XII in 1950, on the Immaculate Conception and the assumption of the Blessed Virgin Mary respectively.

It is Catholic teaching that, with Christ and the Apostles, revelation was complete. Dogmas issued after the death of his apostles are not new, but explications of existing faith. Implicit truths are specified as explicit, as was done in the teachings on the Trinity by the ecumenical councils. Karl Rahner tries to explain this with the allegorical sentence of a husband to his wife, "I love you"; this surely implies, I am faithful to you. In the 5th century Vincent of Lérins wrote, in Commonitory, that there should be progress within the church, 
on condition that it be real progress, not alteration of the faith. For progress requires that the subject be enlarged in itself, alteration, that it be transformed into something else. The intelligence, then, the knowledge, the wisdom, [...] of individuals [...] as well of [...] the whole Church, ought, in the course of ages and centuries, to increase and make much and vigorous progress; but yet only in its own kind; that is to say, in the same doctrine, in the same sense, and in the same meaning.
Vincent commented on the First Epistle to Timothy that Timothy, for Vincent, represented "either generally the Universal Church, or in particular, the whole body of The Prelacy", whose obligation is "to possess or to communicate to others a complete knowledge of religion" called the deposit of faith. According to Vincent, the deposit of faith was entrusted and not "devised: a matter not of wit, but of learning; not of private adoption, but of public tradition." Vincent expounded that you "received gold, give gold in turn," and not a substitute or a counterfeit. Vincent explained that those who are qualified by a "divine gift" should "by wit, by skill, by learning" expound and clarify "that which formerly was believed, though imperfectly apprehended" – to understand "what antiquity venerated without understanding" and teach "the same truths" in a new way. The church uses this text in its interpretation of dogmatic development. In 1870, the First Vatican Council quoted from Commonitory and stated, in the dogmatic constitution Dei Filius, that "meaning of the sacred dogmas is perpetually to be retained" once they have been declared by the Catholic Church and "there must never be a deviation from that meaning on the specious ground and title of a more profound understanding." In 1964, the Second Vatican Council further developed this in Lumen Gentium.

Classification 
According to Catholic theologian Ludwig Ott:

Theological certainty

The magisterium of the church is directed to guard, preserve and teach divine truths which God has revealed with infallibility (de fide). A rejection of church magisterial teachings is a de facto rejection of the divine revelation. It is considered the mortal sin of heresy if the heretical opinion is held with full knowledge of the church's opposing dogmas. The infallibility of the magisterium extends also to teachings which are deduced from such truths (fides ecclesiastica). These church teachings or "Catholic truths" (veritates catholicae) are not a part of the divine revelation, yet are intimately related to it. The rejection of these "secondary" teachings is heretical, and entails loss of full communion with the Catholic Church. More degrees of theological certainty exist. Those different degrees are called theological notes.

Examples of dogmatic definitions

Ecumenical councils
 Nicaea I: divine filiation
 Ephesus: Mary is the Mother of God
 Chalcedon: Jesus is true man, with a human body and a human soul
 Constantinople: Jesus is true God and has a human will and a divine will
 Nicaea II: holy images may be created and are owed veneration, not adoration
 Vatican I: papal infallibility

Council of Trent
The Council of Trent made a number of dogmatic definitions about the sacraments and other beliefs and practices of the church, such as the following:
 transubstantiation
 purgatory
 seal ("secret") of the sacrament of Confession is inviolable
 polygamy is a sin

Ex cathedra
 Pius IX: Immaculate Conception of Mary
 Pius XII: Assumption of Mary

Papal bulls and encyclicals

Pope Pius XII stated in Humani generis that papal encyclicals, even when they are not , can nonetheless be sufficiently authoritative to end theological debate on a particular question:

The end of the theological debate is not identical, however, with dogmatization. Throughout the history of the church, its representatives have discussed whether a given papal teaching is the final word or not.

In 1773, Lorenzo Ricci, hearing rumours that Pope Clement XIV might dissolve the Jesuit Order, wrote "it is most incredible that the Deputy of Christ would state the opposite, what his predecessor Pope Clement XIII stated in the papal bull , in which he defended and protected us." When, a few days later, he was asked if he would accept the papal brief reverting Clement XIII and dissolving the Jesuit Order, Ricci replied that whatever the Pope decides must be sacred to everybody.

In 1995, questions arose as to whether the apostolic letter , which upheld the Catholic teaching that only men may receive ordination, is to be understood as belonging to the deposit of faith. Pope John Paul II wrote, "Wherefore, in order that all doubt may be removed regarding a matter of great importance, a matter which pertains to the Church's divine constitution itself, in virtue of Our ministry of confirming the brethren (cf. Lk 22:32) We declare that the Church has no authority whatsoever to confer priestly ordination on women and that this judgment is to be definitively held by all the Church's faithful." Dulles, in a lecture to U.S. bishops, stated that ' is infallible, not because of the apostolic letter or the clarification by Cardinal Joseph Ratzinger alone but because it is based on a wide range of sources, scriptures, the constant tradition of the church, and the ordinary and universal magisterium of the church: Pope John Paul II identified a truth infallibly taught over two thousand years by the church.

Critics of Ordinatio Sacerdotalis point out, though, that it was not promulgated under the extraordinary papal magisterium as an  statement, and therefore is not considered infallible in itself.

Apparitions and revelations

Private revelations have taken place within the Catholic Church since the very beginning. For example, the account of Our Lady of the Pillar appearing to James the Greater. However, apparitions are not a part of sacred tradition, since that would imply divine revelation is incomplete, which in turn would imply God can perfect himself.

The Catholic Church distinguishes between the apparitions within divine revelation – such as the risen Jesus' apparitions to the Apostles and the sign of the woman in the Book of Revelation – and apparitions without divine revelation – such as Our Lady of Lourdes and Our Lady of Fatima – because the age of divine revelation was closed with the completion of the New Testament when the last of the Apostles died.

While Our Lady of the Pillar appeared during the Apostolic Age, the apparition is not a dogma since it is not part of the Catholic faith, in the Bible or in sacred tradition. It is a local tradition, which is distinct from sacred tradition.

Ecumenical aspects
Protestant theology since the reformation was largely negative on the term dogma. This changed in the 20th century, when Karl Barth in his book  stated the need for systematic and binding articles of faith.

The Creed is the most comprehensive – but not complete – summary of important Catholic dogmas (it was originally used during baptism ceremonies). The Creed is a part of Sunday liturgy. Because many Protestant Churches have retained the older versions of the Creed, ecumenical working groups are meeting to discuss the Creed as the basis for better understandings of dogma.

See also
 Catholic dogmatic theology
Catholic Mariology#Dogmatic teachings
Enchiridion symbolorum, definitionum et declarationum de rebus fidei et morum
Dogmatic fact

Notes

References

Sources

Further reading 

 
 
 
 

Catholic theology and doctrine
Catholic doctrines
Dogma